David Isaacs may refer to:

 David Isaacs (singer) (1946–2009), Jamaican reggae singer 
 David Isaacs (writer), American TV screenwriter and producer
 David Isaacs (UFC Cofounder), American TV/live event producer and UFC Cofounder

See also 
 David Isaac (disambiguation)
 Isaac Davis (disambiguation)